The Rocks and Boulder Cove, the climbing area at the Summit Bechtel Family National Scout Reserve located in Fayette and Raleigh Counties, near Beckley, is the largest man-made climbing facility in the world.

Purpose and uses 

The Summit Bechtel Family National Scout Reserve’s primary function is to host the National Boy Scout Scout Jamboree every 4 years. The climbing walls at The Summit Bechtel Reserve make up the largest outdoor climbing facility in the world.

The rock climbing structure was built to be a key part of the programming for the National Jamboree in 2013, keeping in mind that it would also be used in a larger event in 2019, the World Scout Jamboree.

Size and features 

The rock climbing area features over 60,000 square feet of climbing terrain, and enough designated climbing lanes to accommodate over 200 climbers at any given time. The area is split into two parts, The Rocks and Boulder Cove.

The Rocks 

The Rocks has 36 rappelling stations, six free-standing boulders, and over 150 different climbing stations between the six boulders and the six climbing fins. On these climbing fins, there are over 30 TRUEBLUE automatic belay devices. These devices were chosen because they allow single climbers to climb without the need for a belayer and they provide a safer experience for climbers. The auto belays are also used in a feature called the “Leap of Faith” that can be done between the two rappelling towers located in the climbing facility.

The Boulder Cove 

The Boulder Cove features top rope climbing, rappelling, and bouldering features. The top-rope climbing structures range in height from 19 to 36 feet. There are 25 lanes that can accommodate a single climber at any given time. These structures also have designated lanes for rappelling. Along with the 12 rappel stations on the climbing walls, there is a 72-foot platform where patrons can rappel as well. Lastly, there are three climbing boulders with an average height of 13 feet.

How the Rocks and Boulder Cove came to be the world's largest climbing facility 

Initially, the outdoor climbing facility at the Summit Bechtel National Scout Reserve was not purposely intended to be the largest in the world. The required function, however, determined the necessary form.

The Summit Bechtel National Scout Reserve was to be the site of the 2013 National Boy Scout Jamboree, an event that brings over 40,000 Scouts nationwide to one location for a week of camping and adventuring. In order to accommodate the necessary throughput, Eldorado Climbing Walls, the climbing wall manufacturer responsible for the design and construction of the structures, had to create the world's largest man made outdoor climbing facility. In an interview, the lead designer on the project, Jason Thomas, said that, “the largest driving factor of our design was the fact that we had to move 30,000 to 40,000 Scouts through these walls and create a lasting experience for each and every one of them. A 30,000 square foot climbing gym might take two, three months to design. These walls are small climbing gyms put together.”

The final design was determined by a number of requirements. The walls not only had to host 40,000 Scouts over a week's period, but they also had to blend seamlessly into the surrounding New River Gorge. On top of that, the walls needed to provide terrain appropriate for all skill levels, from beginners to seasoned climbers. Finally, the walls needed to allow for smooth traffic flow in a high volume situation.

Construction 

The walls were constructed by Eldorado Climbing Walls from a rock-realistic product called SHOTRock, a Glass Fiber Reinforced Concrete that mimics the look and feel of real rock. This product was chosen for its durability in outdoor applications, which was especially important in West Virginia, where the structures would be subject to rain, snow, and sunlight as the seasons shifted.

West Virginia's weather patterns impacted the construction process as well as the product chosen. During the winter of 2012–2013, there were many days and nights of heavy snow, which posed challenges on the construction crews. Concrete blankets, heaters, and various other methods were employed to help the product cure and set properly.

Construction began in late 2012 and was completed just a few weeks before the Summit Bechtel National Scout Reserve was to open its grounds to the National Boy Scouts Jamboree on July 15, 2013.

Other record breaking structures at the Summit Bechtel Family Resort 

 Canopy Tours: Number one in the world for total mileage.
 Zip Lines: Number one in the world for total mileage (5.45 miles)
 Challenge Courses: Number one in the world for number of courses available at one facility
 Mountain Biking: Number one purpose-built facility in the world and number three in the world for total mileage
 BMX: Number two in the world for indoor and outdoor square footage of facilities.
 Skate: Number two in the world for outdoor square footage of facilities.
 Barrels: Number three in the world in total shooting opportunities
 Archery: Number three in the world in total shooting opportunities

References 

Climbing areas of the United States